Pride of Lions (1996), by the American-Irish author Morgan Llywelyn, is a novel about the lives of the children of Irish hero and High King Brian Boru, particularly his son, Donough, after the Battle of Clontarf. It is a sequel to Lion of Ireland published in 1980.

1996 fantasy novels
Novels by Morgan Llywelyn
Novels set in Ireland
Novels set in the 11th century